The 1919 Leyton West by-election was a parliamentary by-election held on 1 March 1919 for the British House of Commons constituency of Leyton West, in the Urban District of Leyton, Essex. The constituency formed part of the Greater London conurbation.

Vacancy
The seat had become vacant on the death of the constituency's Coalition Unionist Member of Parliament (MP), Harry Wrightson on 11 February 1919. Wrightson had first been elected at the 1918 general election. Within days of the declaration of poll however, Wrightson contracted influenza, which deteriorated to pneumonia, and he died early in 1919, aged 44, six days before the new Parliament met and so was never able to take his seat.

Electoral history

Candidates 
The Unionist Party selected as its candidate James Francis Mason, who was a director of the Great Western Railway and had been MP for Windsor between 1906 and the preceding General Election.

Alfred Ernest Newbould stood for the Asquithian Liberals. He had stood against Wrightson at the recent General Election, coming in second with less than half of Wrightson's votes.

Campaign
Mason's campaign sought to repeat the theme of the previous General Election, where Unionists had run solely on the glory of having won the war. 
Newbould's main campaign points were the abolition of conscription and a crackdown on profiteering  the first policy was said to appeal to men and the second to women. Unfortunately for part of the contest he was confined to bed with a bad cold and his wife was engaged as principal canvasser on his behalf.

Result
On a turnout of 42.5%, (down from the general election turnout of 49.9%) Newbould won what was seen as an important victory for the Asquithian Liberals improving his share of the vote from 32.6% at the general election to 57.3% in the by-election. 

According to psephologist John Ramsden, this amounted to a swing of 24.8% and was statistically one of the worst by-election reverses of the 1918–1922 government.

Aftermath
At the 1922 general election, Newbould lost the seat back to the Unionists, and never got back into the House.

See also
 List of United Kingdom by-elections
 Leyton West constituency

References
 
 
 The Times, 15 March 1919

Leyton West by-election
Leyton West by-election
Leyton West by-election
Leyton West,1919
Leyton West,1919
Leyton